Snuol is a district in Kratié province, Cambodia. According to the 1998 census of Cambodia, it had a population of 35,156. The population recorded by the 2008 census was 61,603.

Administration
As of 2020, the district contains the following communes and villages.

References

Districts of Kratié province